Luis Erney Vásquez (born 1 March 1996) is a Colombian professional footballer who plays for Independiente Medellín.

References

1996 births
Living people
Colombian footballers
Colombia under-20 international footballers
Categoría Primera A players
Categoría Primera B players
Independiente Medellín footballers
Real Cartagena footballers
Atlético Junior footballers
Valledupar F.C. footballers
Association football goalkeepers
Sportspeople from Valle del Cauca Department